John David Ashcroft (born May 9, 1942) is an American lawyer, lobbyist and former politician who served as the 79th U.S. Attorney General in the George W. Bush administration from 2001 to 2005. A former U.S. Senator from Missouri and the 50th Governor of Missouri, he later founded the Ashcroft Group, a Washington D.C. lobbying firm.

Ashcroft previously served as Auditor of Missouri (1973–1975) and Attorney General of Missouri (1977–1985). As Missouri Governor (1985–1993), he was elected for two consecutive terms (a historical first for a Republican candidate in the state). He also served one term as a U.S. Senator from Missouri (1995–2001). Ashcroft had early appointments in Missouri state government and was mentored by John Danforth. He has written several books about politics and ethics. Since 2011 he sits on the board of directors for the private military company Academi (formerly Blackwater) and is a professor at the Regent University School of Law, a conservative Christian institution affiliated with televangelist Pat Robertson; he has also been a member of the Federalist Society.

His son, Jay Ashcroft, is also a politician, serving as Secretary of State of Missouri since January 2017.

Early life and education
Ashcroft was born in Chicago, Illinois, the son of Grace P. (née Larsen) and James Robert Ashcroft. The family later lived in Willard, Missouri, where his father was a minister in an Assemblies of God congregation in nearby Springfield, served as president of Evangel University (1958–74), and jointly as President of Central Bible College (1958–63). His mother was a homemaker, whose parents had emigrated from Norway. His paternal grandfather was an Irish immigrant.

Ashcroft graduated from Hillcrest High School in 1960. He attended Yale University, where he was a member of the St. Elmo Society, graduating in 1964. He received a Juris Doctor from the University of Chicago Law School (1967).

After law school, Ashcroft briefly taught Business Law and worked as an administrator at Southwest Missouri State University. During the Vietnam War, he was not drafted because he received six student draft deferments and one occupational deferment because of his teaching work.

Political career

Missouri State Auditor
In 1972, Ashcroft ran for a congressional seat in southwest Missouri in the Republican primary election, narrowly losing to Gene Taylor. After the primary, Missouri Governor Kit Bond appointed Ashcroft to the office of State Auditor, which Bond had vacated when he became governor.

In 1974, Ashcroft was narrowly defeated for election to that post by Jackson County County Executive George W. Lehr. He had argued that Ashcroft, who is not an accountant, was not qualified to be the State Auditor.

Attorney General of Missouri

Missouri Attorney General John Danforth, who was then in his second term, hired Ashcroft as an assistant state attorney general. During his service, Ashcroft shared an office with future U.S. Supreme Court Justice Clarence Thomas (and in 2001, as it would come to pass, Justice Thomas would administer Ashcroft's oath of office as U.S. attorney general).

In 1976, Danforth was elected to the U.S. Senate, and Ashcroft was elected to replace him as state attorney general. He was sworn in on December 27, 1976.  In 1980, Ashcroft was re-elected with 64.5 percent of the vote, winning 96 of Missouri's 114 counties.

In 1983, Ashcroft wrote the leading amicus curiae brief in the U.S. Supreme Court Case Sony Corp. of America v. Universal City Studios, Inc., supporting the use of video cassette recorders for time shifting of television programs.

Governor of Missouri (1985–1993)

Ashcroft was elected governor in 1984 and re-elected in 1988, becoming the first (and to date only) Republican in Missouri history elected to two consecutive terms.

In 1984, his opponent was the Democratic Lieutenant Governor Ken Rothman. The campaign was so negative on both sides that a reporter described the contest as "two alley cats [scrapping] over truth in advertising". In his campaign ads, Ashcroft showed the contrast between his rural-base and the supporters of his urban-based opponent from St. Louis. Democrats did not close ranks on primary night. The defeated candidate Mel Carnahan endorsed Rothman. In the end, Ashcroft won 57 percent of the vote and carried 106 counties—then the largest Republican gubernatorial victory in Missouri history.

In 1988, Ashcroft won by a larger margin over his Democratic opponent, Betty Cooper Hearnes, the wife of the former governor Warren Hearnes. Ashcroft received 64 percent of the vote in the general election—the largest landslide for governor in Missouri history since the U.S. Civil War.

During his second term, Ashcroft served as chairman of the National Governors Association (1991–92).

U.S. Senator from Missouri

In 1994 Ashcroft was elected to the U.S. Senate from Missouri, again succeeding John Danforth, who retired from the position. Ashcroft won 59.8% of the vote against Democratic Congressman Alan Wheat. As Senator:
 He opposed the Clinton Administration's Clipper encryption restrictions, arguing in favor of the individual's right to encrypt messages and export encryption software.
 In 1999, as chair of the Senate's subcommittee on patents, he helped extend patents for several drugs, most significantly the allergy medication Claritin, to prevent the marketing of less-expensive generics.
 On March 30, 2000, with Senator Russ Feingold, Ashcroft convened the only Senate hearing on racial profiling. He said the practice was unconstitutional and that he supported legislation requiring police to keep statistics on their actions.

In 1998, Ashcroft briefly considered running for U.S. president; but on January 5, 1999, he decided that he would seek re-election to his Senate seat in the 2000 election and not run for president.

In the Republican primary, Ashcroft defeated Marc Perkel. In the general election, Ashcroft faced a challenge from Governor Mel Carnahan.

In the midst of a tight race, Carnahan died in an airplane crash three weeks prior to the election. Ashcroft suspended all campaigning after the plane crash. Because of Missouri state election laws and the short time to election, Carnahan's name remained on the ballot. Lieutenant Governor Roger B. Wilson became governor upon Carnahan's death. Wilson said that should Carnahan be elected, he would appoint his widow, Jean Carnahan, to serve in her husband's place; Mrs. Carnahan stated that, in accordance with her late husband's goal, she would serve in the Senate if voters elected his name. Following these developments, Ashcroft resumed campaigning.

Carnahan won the election 51% to 49%. No one had ever posthumously won election to the Senate, though voters had on at least three occasions chosen deceased candidates for the House of Representatives. Ashcroft remains the only U.S. Senator defeated for re-election by a dead person.

U.S. Attorney General

In December 2000, following his Senatorial defeat, Ashcroft was chosen for the position of U.S. attorney general by president-elect George W. Bush. He was confirmed by the Senate by a vote of 58 to 42, with most Democratic senators voting against him, citing his prior opposition to using forced busing to achieve desegregation, and their opposition to Ashcroft's opposition to abortion. At the time of his appointment he was known to be a member of the Federalist Society.

In May 2001, the FBI revealed that they had misplaced thousands of documents related to the investigation of the Oklahoma City bombing. Ashcroft granted a 30-day stay of execution for Timothy McVeigh, the man sentenced to death for the bombing.

In July 2001, Ashcroft began flying exclusively by private jet. When questioned about this decision, the Justice Department explained that this course of action had been recommended based on a “threat assessment” made by the FBI. Neither the Bureau, nor the Justice Department would identify the specific nature of the threat, who made it, or when it happened. The CIA were unaware of any specific threats against Cabinet members. Ashcroft is the only Cabinet appointee who travels on a private jet, excluding the special cases of Interior and Energy who have responsibilities which require chartered jets.

After the September 11, 2001 attacks in the United States, Ashcroft was a key administration supporter of passage of the USA Patriot Act. One of its provisions, Section 215, allows the Federal Bureau of Investigation (FBI) to apply for an order from the Foreign Intelligence Surveillance Court to require production of "any tangible thing" for an investigation. This provision was criticized by citizen and professional groups concerned about violations of privacy. Ashcroft referred to the American Library Association's opposition to Section 215 as "hysteria" in two separate speeches given in September 2003. While Attorney General, Ashcroft consistently denied that the FBI or any other law enforcement agency had used the Patriot Act to obtain library circulation records or those of retail sales. According to the sworn testimony of two FBI agents interviewed by the 9/11 Commission, Ashcroft ignored warnings of an imminent al-Qaida attack.

In January 2002, the partially nude female statue of the Spirit of Justice in the Robert F. Kennedy Department of Justice Building, where Ashcroft held press conferences, was covered with blue curtains. Department officials long insisted that the curtains were put up to improve the room's use as a television backdrop and that Ashcroft had nothing to do with it. Ashcroft's successor, Alberto Gonzales, removed the curtains in June 2005. Ashcroft also held daily prayer meetings.

In March 2004, the Justice Department under Ashcroft ruled President Bush's domestic intelligence program illegal. Shortly afterward, he was hospitalized with acute gallstone pancreatitis. White House Counsel Alberto Gonzales and Chief of Staff Andrew Card Jr. went to Ashcroft's bedside in the hospital intensive-care unit, to persuade the incapacitated Attorney General to sign a document to reauthorize the program. Acting Attorney General James Comey alerted FBI Director Robert Mueller III of this plan, and rushed to the hospital, arriving ahead of Gonzales and Card, Jr. Ashcroft, "summoning the strength to lift his head and speak", refused to sign. Attempts to reauthorize the program were ended by President Bush when Ashcroft, Comey and Mueller threatened to resign.

Following accounts of the Abu Ghraib torture and prisoner abuse scandal in Iraq, one of the Torture memos was leaked to the press in June 2004. Jack Goldsmith, then head of the Office of Legal Counsel, had already withdrawn the Yoo memos and advised agencies not to rely on them. After Goldsmith was forced to resign because of his objections, Attorney General Ashcroft issued a one paragraph opinion re-authorizing the use of torture.

Ashcroft pushed his U.S. attorneys to pursue voter fraud cases. However, the U.S. attorneys struggled to find any deliberate voter fraud schemes, only finding individuals who made mistakes on forms or misunderstood whether they were eligible to vote.

Following George W. Bush's re-election, Ashcroft resigned, which took effect on February 3, 2005, after the Senate confirmed White House Counsel Alberto Gonzales as the next attorney general. Ashcroft said in his hand-written resignation letter, dated November 2, "The objective of securing the safety of Americans from crime and terror has been achieved."

Consultant and lobbyist
In May 2005, Ashcroft laid the groundwork for a strategic consulting firm, The Ashcroft Group, LLC. He started operation in the fall of 2005 and as of March 2006 had twenty-one clients, turning down two for every one accepted. In 2005 year-end filings, Ashcroft's firm reported collecting $269,000, including $220,000 from Oracle Corporation, which won Department of Justice approval of a multibillion-dollar acquisition less than a month after hiring Ashcroft. The year-end filing represented, in some cases, only initial payments.

According to government filings, Oracle is one of five Ashcroft Group clients that seek help in selling data or software with security applications. Another client, Israel Aircraft Industries International, is competing with Seattle's Boeing Company to sell the government of South Korea a billion dollar airborne radar system.

In March 2006, Ashcroft positioned himself as an "anti-Abramoff". In an hour-long interview, Ashcroft used the word integrity scores of times. In May 2006, based on conversations with members of Congress, key aides and lobbyists, The Hill magazine listed Ashcroft as one of the top 50 "hired guns" (lobbyists) that K Street had to offer.

By August 2006, Ashcroft's firm reportedly had 30 clients, many of which made products or technology aimed at homeland security. About a third of its client list were not disclosed on grounds of confidentiality. The firm also had equity stakes in eight client companies. It reportedly received $1.4 million in lobbying fees in the past six months, a small fraction of its total earnings.

After the proposed merger of Sirius Satellite Radio Inc. and XM Satellite Radio Holdings Inc., Ashcroft offered the firm his consulting services, according to a spokesman for XM. The spokesman said XM declined Ashcroft's offer. Ashcroft was subsequently hired by the National Association of Broadcasters, which is strongly opposed to the merger.

In 2011, Ashcroft became an “independent director” on the board of Xe Services (now Academi), the controversial private military company formerly known as Blackwater (Nisour Square massacre), which faced scores of charges related to weapons trafficking, unlawful force, and corruption had named Ted Wright as CEO in May 2011. Wright hired a new governance chief to oversee ethical and legal compliance and established a new board composed of former government officials, including former White House counsel Jack Quinn and Ashcroft. In December 2011, Xe Services rebranded to Academi to convey a more "boring" image.

The firm also has a law firm under its umbrella, called the Ashcroft Law Firm. In December 2014, the law firm was hired by convicted Russian arms trafficker Viktor Bout to overturn his 2011 conviction.

In June 2017, Ashcroft was hired by the government of Qatar to carry out a compliance and regulatory review of Qatar's anti-money laundering and counter-terrorist financing framework, to help challenge accusations of supporting terrorism by its neighbors, following a regional blockade, as well as claims by U.S. President Donald Trump.

In June 2018, Ashcroft was reportedly hired by Najib Razak among other top U.S lawyers to defend him in the 1MDB scandal, back in 2016. According to the document, the firm was hired to provide legal advice and counsel to Najib regarding "improper actions by third parties to attempt to destabilise the government of Malaysia". Although it is unsure whether Najib will retain the services of Ashcroft on the issue due to the United States Department of Justice's probe into 1MDB.

Political issues

In July 2002, Ashcroft proposed the creation of Operation TIPS, a domestic program in which workers and government employees would inform law enforcement agencies about suspicious behavior they encounter while performing their duties. The program was widely criticized from the beginning, with critics deriding the program as essentially a Domestic Informant Network along the lines of the East German Stasi or the Soviet KGB, and an encroachment upon the First and Fourth amendments. The United States Postal Service refused to be a party to it. Ashcroft defended the program as a necessary component of the ongoing War on Terrorism, but the proposal was eventually abandoned.

Ashcroft proposed a draft of the Domestic Security Enhancement Act of 2003, legislation to expand the powers of the U.S. government to fight crime and terrorism, while simultaneously eliminating or curtailing judicial review of these powers for incidents related to domestic terrorism. The bill was leaked and posted to the Internet on February 7, 2003.

On May 26, 2004, Ashcroft held a news conference at which he said that intelligence from multiple sources indicated that the terrorist organization, al Qaeda, intended to attack the United States in the coming months. Critics suggested he was trying to distract attention from a drop in the approval ratings of President Bush, who was campaigning for re-election.

Groups supporting individual gun ownership praised Ashcroft's support through DOJ for the Second Amendment. He said specifically, "the Second Amendment protects an individual's right to keep and bear arms," expressing the position that the second amendment expresses a right.

In 2009 in Ashcroft v. al-Kidd, the Ninth Circuit Court of Appeals in San Francisco found that Ashcroft could be sued and held personally responsible for the wrongful detention of Abdullah al-Kidd. The American citizen was arrested at Dulles Airport in March 2003 on his way to Saudi Arabia for study. He was held for 15 days in maximum security in three states, and 13 months in supervised release, to be used as a material witness in the trial of Sami Omar Al-Hussayen. (The latter was acquitted of all charges of supporting terrorism). Al-Kidd was never charged and was not called as a witness in the Al-Hussayen case.

The panels court described the government's assertions under the USA Patriot Act (2001) as "repugnant of the Constitution". In a detailed and at times passionate opinion, Judge Milan Smith likened allegations against al-Kidd as similar to the repressive practices of the British Crown that sparked the American Revolution. He wrote that the government asserts it can detain American citizens "not because there is evidence that they have committed a crime, but merely because the government wishes to investigate them for possible wrongdoing". He called it "a painful reminder of some of the most ignominious chapters of our national history".

Abdullah Al-Kidd was held in a maximum security prison for 16 days, and in supervised release for 13 months. Al-Kidd was born Lavoni T. Kidd in 1973 in Wichita, Kansas. When he converted to Islam as a student at the University of Idaho, where he was a prominent football player, he changed his name. He asserts that Ashcroft violated his civil liberties as an American citizen, as he was treated like a terrorist and not allowed to consult an attorney. Al-Kidd's lawyers say Ashcroft, as US attorney general, encouraged authorities after 9/11 to arrest potential suspects as material witnesses when they lacked probable cause to believe the suspects had committed a crime.

The US Supreme Court agreed on October 18, 2010, to hear the case. On May 31, 2011, the US Supreme Court unanimously overturned the lower court's decision, saying that al-Kidd could not personally sue Ashcroft, as he was protected by limited immunity as a government official. A majority of the justices held that al-Kidd could not have won his case on the merits, because Ashcroft did not violate his Fourth Amendment rights.

Ashcroft has been a proponent of the War on Drugs. In a 2001 interview on Larry King Live, Ashcroft stated his intention to increase efforts in this area. In 2003, two nationwide investigations code-named Operation Pipe Dream and Operation Headhunter, which targeted businesses selling drug paraphernalia, mostly for cannabis use, resulted in a series of indictments.

Tommy Chong, a counterculture icon, was one of those charged, for his part in financing and promoting Chong Glass/Nice Dreams, a company started by his son Paris. Of the 55 individuals charged as a result of the operations, only Chong was given a prison sentence after conviction (nine months in a federal prison, plus forfeiting $103,000 and a year of probation). The other 54 individuals were given fines and home detentions. While the DOJ denied that Chong was treated any differently from the other defendants, critics thought the government was trying to make an example of him. Chong's experience as a target of Ashcroft's sting operation is the subject of Josh Gilbert's feature-length documentary a/k/a Tommy Chong, which premiered at the 2005 Toronto International Film Festival. In a pre-sentencing brief, the Department of Justice specifically cited Chong's entertainment career as a consideration against leniency.

When Karl Rove was being questioned in 2005 by the FBI over the leak of a covert CIA agent's identity in the press (the Valerie Plame affair), Ashcroft was allegedly briefed about the investigation. The Democratic U.S. Representative John Conyers described this as a "stunning ethical breach that cries out for an immediate investigation." Conyers, the ranking Democrat on the House Judiciary Committee, asked, in a statement, for a formal investigation of the time between the start of Rove's investigation and John Ashcroft's recusal.

Since his service in government, Ashcroft has continued to oppose proposals for physician-assisted suicide, which some states have passed by referendums. When interviewed about it in 2012, when a case had reached the US Supreme Court after California voters had approved a law to permit it under regulated conditions, he said,

I certainly believe that people who are in pain should be helped and assisted in every way possible, that the drugs should be used to mitigate their pain but I believe the law of the United States of America which requires that drugs not be used except for legitimate health purposes.

In 2015, Human Rights Watch called for the investigation of Ashcroft "for conspiracy to torture as well as other crimes."

Personal life

Ashcroft is a member of the Assemblies of God church. He is married to Janet E. Ashcroft and has three children with her. His son, Jay, is the Missouri Secretary of State.

Ashcroft had long enjoyed inspirational music and singing. In the 1970s, he recorded a gospel record entitled Truth: Volume One, Edition One, with the Missouri legislator Max Bacon, a Democrat.

With fellow U.S. senators Trent Lott, Larry Craig, and Jim Jeffords, Ashcroft formed a barbershop quartet called The Singing Senators. The men performed at social events with other senators. Ashcroft performed the Star Spangled Banner before the National Hockey League all-star game in St. Louis in 1988.

Ashcroft composed a paean titled "Let the Eagle Soar," which he sang at the Gordon-Conwell Theological Seminary in February 2002. Ashcroft has written and sung a number of other songs. He has collected these on compilation tapes, including In the Spirit of Life and Liberty and Gospel (Music) According to John. In 1998, he wrote a book with author Gary Thomas titled Lessons from a Father to His Son.

Ashcroft was given an honorary doctorate before giving the commencement at Toccoa Falls College in 2018.

Books
 Co-author with Jane E. Ashcroft, College Law for Business, textbook (10th edition, 1987)
 On My Honor: The Beliefs that Shape My Life (1998)
 Lessons From a Father to His Son (2002)
 Never Again: Securing America and Restoring Justice (2006)

Representation in other media
 His song, "Let the Eagle Soar", was satirically featured in Michael Moore's 2004 movie Fahrenheit 9/11 and has been frequently mocked by comedians such as David Letterman, Stephen Colbert and David Cross, to name a few.
 The song was performed at Bush's 2005 inauguration by Guy Hovis, a former cast member of The Lawrence Welk Show.
"Let the Eagle Soar" is heard in the background in the 2015 film The Big Short, as an ironic juxtaposition of schmaltzy music and new-age capitalist sensibility when a phone call is placed to pastoral Boulder, Colorado, where anti-authoritarian ex-banking trader Ben Rickert (played by Brad Pitt) lives.
 The song "Caped Crusader" off of Jello Biafra and the Melvins' 2004 album Never Breathe What You Can't See lifts several lines from Ashcroft and 9/11 hijacker Mohamed Atta in a satirical attack on religious fundamentalism.

References

External links

 BBC News' John Ashcroft profile
 CNN video of John Ashcroft singing "Let the Eagle Soar"
 Excerpts from an album Ashcroft recorded in the 1970s
 Ashcroft's Senate voting record
 Transcript of James Comey's testimony before the Senate Judiciary Committee, May 15, 2007
 

|-

|-

|-

|-

|-

|-

|-

|-

|-

|-

1942 births
Living people
20th-century American politicians
20th-century Protestants
21st-century American politicians
21st-century Protestants
American Pentecostals
American people of Norwegian descent
American Christian writers
American legal writers
American non-fiction writers
Assemblies of God people
Christians from Missouri
George W. Bush administration cabinet members
Republican Party governors of Missouri
Lawyers from Chicago
Missouri Attorneys General
Missouri lawyers
Musicians from Chicago
Musicians from Missouri
Politicians from Chicago
Republican Party United States senators from Missouri
State Auditors of Missouri
United States Attorneys General
University of Chicago Law School alumni
Yale University alumni
Federalist Society members
Members of Congress who became lobbyists